Desislav Rusev (born 27 April 1979) is a Bulgarian footballer who plays as a forward for Vihar Slavyanovo.

Rusev previously played for Litex Lovech, Vidima-Rakovski Sevlievo, Rodopa Smolyan and Vihren Sandanski in the A PFG.

Honours
Litex Lovech
Bulgarian Cup: 2003–04

References

External links

1979 births
Living people
Bulgarian footballers
First Professional Football League (Bulgaria) players
Second Professional Football League (Bulgaria) players
PFC Litex Lovech players
PFC Vidima-Rakovski Sevlievo players
PFC Rodopa Smolyan players
PFC Spartak Varna players
OFC Vihren Sandanski players
PFC Lokomotiv Mezdra players
FC Chernomorets Balchik players
PFC Kaliakra Kavarna players
OFC Bdin Vidin players
PFC Spartak Pleven players
PFC Akademik Svishtov players
Association football forwards